Tevfik Esenç (1904 – 7 October 1992) was a Turkish citizen of Circassian origin, known for being the last speaker of the Ubykh language. He was fluent in Ubykh, Adyghe and Turkish. After his death in 1992, the Ubykh language went extinct despite the efforts and work of numerous linguists to revive it. Nevertheless, Esenç is single-handedly responsible for the world's current knowledge of Ubykh language and culture being as extensive and detailed as it is.

Biography

Esenç was raised by his Ubykh-speaking grandparents for a time in the village of Hacıosman (Ubykh: Lak°'ạ́ṡ°a; Adyghe: Hundjahabl) in Turkey, and he served a term as the muhtar (mayor) of that village, before receiving a post in the civil service of Istanbul. There, he was able to do a great deal of work with the French linguist Georges Dumézil and his associate Georges Charachidzé to help record his language, although not all the writings of Charachidzé (1930–2010) have been published. Others who met Esenç and produced work on Ubykh are: the Norwegian Hans Vogt (1911–92); the British George Hewitt, who in made recordings with Esenç in Istanbul; the Abkhazian Viacheslav Chirikba, who has written on Ubykh settlements and Ubykh surnames; and the Turkish linguist A. Sumru Özsoy.

Having an excellent memory and understanding quickly the goals of Dumézil and the other linguists who came to visit him, he was a primary source of not only the Ubykh language, but also of the mythology, culture history, and customs of the Ubykh people. He spoke Turkish and Ubykh, and also a dialect of Adyghe (West Circassian), allowing some comparative work to be done between these two members of the Northwest Caucasian family. A purist, his idiolect of Ubykh was considered by Dumézil as the closest thing to a standard "literary" Ubykh language that existed.

He finished his work for Ubykh with the following speech to his long-time collaborator Georges Charachidzé:

Esenç died in the night of 7 October 1992, at the age of 88; he was buried in the village cemetery of Hacıosman, his birthplace, alongside his wife Emine. He was survived by three sons and two daughters.

In 1994, A. Sumru Özsoy organized an international conference, namely Conference on Northwest Caucasian Linguistics, at Boğaziçi University in memory of Dumézil and Esenç.

References

External links
55 audio recordings of Tevfik Esenç speaking Ubykh, with transcriptions (Pangloss collection, CNRS, Paris)

Account of the burial of the last speaker of Ubykh, Tevfik Esenç from Lingoblog.dk
Trailer of “I had a dream — In the footsteps of the Last Ubykh” – a 66' documentary (2019) on the life of Tevfik Esenç, produced by his granddaughter Burcu Esenç.

1904 births
1992 deaths
People from Manyas
Turkish people of Ubykh descent
Last known speakers of a language
Ubykh language
Mayors of places in Turkey